Cornelius Pedersen Lerche (31 October 1615 - 3 January 1681) was a Danish nobleman and envoy to the Spanish court.

References 

1615 births
1681 deaths
17th-century Danish nobility
Danish diplomats